...And Now Miguel is a novel by Joseph Krumgold that won the Newbery Medal for excellence in American children's literature in 1954. It deals with the life of Miguel Chavez, a 12-year-old Hispanic-American shepherd from New Mexico. It is also the title of a 1953 documentary directed by Krumgold. In 1966, a feature film adaptation was directed by James B. Clark and starred Pat Cardi.

Plot summary
Miguel Chavez has dreamed of visiting the Sangre de Cristo Mountains since he was very little. This summer, he is going to work hard and pray until his father and grandfather realize that he is ready to take the trip with the rest of the older men.

His prayers are granted, though ironically – when his older brother is drafted his father needs an extra body and grudgingly allows Miguel to accompany them.  Miguel is miserable with the manner in which his wish has been granted, and confesses to his brother what he prayed for.  His brother explains that he had been praying to leave New Mexico and see more of the world – while he is not happy about being drafted, he fatalistically accepts that it is the only way he is likely to be able to fulfill his dream.  The brothers resolve to allow God to work freely for the rest of their lives, and not bother God with petty requests.

Illustrations
The book was illustrated by artist Jean Charlot, described as "the greatest artist ever to devote himself regularly to the field of children's books". The New York Herald Tribune reviewer gave credit to Charlot: "Fully half of our pleasure in the book lay in the superb Charlot drawings."

References

External links

 

Newbery Medal–winning works
1953 American novels
American children's novels
Novels set in New Mexico
1953 children's books